Luis Marti-Bonmati is a Spanish professor and researcher. Marti-Bonmati is the founder of QUIBIM S.L., and is the Director of its Scientific Advisory Board. He is also the director of the Biomedical Imaging Research Group (GIBI230) at La Fe Health Research Institute. The group is now included in the Imaging La Fe node at Distributed Network for Biomedical Imaging (ReDIB) Unique Scientific and Technical Infrastructures (ICTS), Valencia, Spain.

Education
He did his undergraduate medical training at the University of Valencia. He completed his postgraduate training as a resident in radiology. He obtained his doctoral thesis (Ph.D.) from the University of Valencia in 1990 with a thesis on magnetic resonance (MR) imaging in liver tumors.

Career 
He joined the radiology department at the first university hospital with an MR system in Spain in 1987. He became the section chief in Magnetic Resonance imaging in this Radiology department (1995) and became professor of radiology at the University of Valencia (2011).

Marti-Bonmati was appointed as President of the Sociedad Española de Diagnóstico por Imagen del Abdomen (SEDIA) in 2000 for seven years. He also served as the President of the European Society of Magnetic Resonance in Medicine and Biology from 2002 to 2004. For two years starting from 2008, he was appointed as the President of the Sociedad Española de Radiología (SERAM). From 2013 to 2015, he served as the President of the European Society of Gastrointestinal and Abdominal Radiology.

He is also a part of the executive council and has served as director of the Research Committee of the European Society of Radiology (ESR, 2010–2013). Marti-Bonmati also serves as the director of Imaging La Fe node at Distributed Network for Biomedical Imaging (ReDIB) Unique Scientific and Technical Infrastructures (ICTS), Valencia, Spain. 

He is the coordinator of the following European projects: PRIMAGE (H2020, GA826494) and CHAIMELEON (H2020, GA952172). Partner of the European projects in ProCancer-I (H2020, GA952159) and PerProGlio (Era PerMed, JTC2018).

Since January 2023, he has been the Scientific Director of the EUropean Federation for CAncer IMages project (EUCAIM) (proposal nº101100633). EUCAIM is a pan-European digital federated infrastructure of FAIR, de-identified cancer medical images coming from Real-World data. The infrastructure is being designed as an experimentation platform to facilitate the development and benchmarking of AI-based cancer management tools towards precision medicine in cancer diagnosis and treatment. To allow this, EUCAIM will provide a dashboard for data discovery, federated search, metadata harvesting, annotation and distributed processing, including federated and privacy-preserving learning. EUCAIM will also build a central hub hosting the Atlas of Cancer Images as part of its infrastructure, which will be interoperable with the other European Health Data Space components while preserving the data sovereignty of providers.

Research
Marti-Bonmati's research interests include liver MR and CT, abdominal and pelvic MRI, contrast agents, image processing, and imaging biomarkers. He also worked in the evaluation of  liver segmentation, the quantification of emphysema and pulmonary vascularization, joint cartilage thickness, schizophrenia, and the microstructure, rigidity, and fragility of the trabecular bone.

His group is involved in providing medical imaging AI solutions as part of cancer management. They are working on image repositories, data harmonization, radiomics, deep features, interoperability, digital twins, in silico emulated trials, open source approaches and image preparation.

Books
Martí-Bonmatí has also published several books.
 Imaging Biomarkers: Development and Clinical Integration. (2016) 
Introduction to the stepwise development of imaging biomarkers. Imaging Biomarkers. Development and clinical integration
The Final step: imaging biomarkers in structured reports. Imaging Biomarkers. Development and clinical integration.
Imaging biomarkers in diffuse liver disease. Quantification of fat and iron. Imaging Biomarkers. Development and clinical integration.
Research in a Radiology Service. Radiology research
Multiparametric Imaging. Functional Imaging in Oncology
Brain Connections – resting state fMRI functional connectivity. Novel Frontiers of advanced neuroimaging

Honors
 Gold Medal in 2014 by Spanish Society of Radiology (SERAM), 2008–2010
Fellow of the International Cancer Imaging Society (ICIS, 2011).
Gold Medal in 2014 from the Spanish Society of Radiology (SERAM).
Gold Medal in 2018 from the European Society of Gastrointestinal and Abdominal Radiology (ESGAR). 
Honorary Fellow of the European Society of Magnetic Resonance in Medicine and Biology (ESMRMB) in 2010.
Fellow of the International Cancer Imaging Society (2011)
Honorary Fellow of the Asian Society of Abdominal Radiology (ASAR, 2015)
Honorary Fellow of the Portuguese Society of Radiology and Nuclear Medicine (2015).
Doctor Honoris Causa from the Tucuman National University (2015)
Doctor Honoris Causa from the University of Coimbra (2019).
Honorary Fellow of the European Society of Medical Imaging Informatics EuSoMII (2019).
Honorary Fellow of the American College of Radiology (2020)
Medical Doctor of the Year in Precision Medicine (2020).
Gold medal by the European Society of Radiology (2021) 
Vice-President of the Federation of European Academies of Medicine (2021)

References

21st-century Spanish physicians
1959 births
Living people
20th-century Spanish physicians
University of Valencia alumni